The superb jewelwing (Calopteryx amata) is a species of damselfly in the family Calopterygidae. It is native to North America, where it is distributed in eastern Canada and the northeastern United States as far south as Tennessee.

The superb jewelwing is about 2 inches long. The male is bright metallic green with amber markings on its wings. The female is bronze-tinged with greenish wings tipped in white. The adult is active in June and July. Adults and nymphs eat smaller insects.

This species lives along clear rivers and streams with vegetation nearby. The males are territorial. This species may be found with dragonflies of the genus Ophiogomphus.

References

Calopterygidae
Odonata of North America
Insects of Canada
Insects of the United States
Least concern biota of the United States
Insects described in 1889
Taxa named by Hermann August Hagen